Ana Nisi Goyco Graziani (March 9, 1951 in Ponce, Puerto Rico – February 8, 2019 in Ponce, Puerto Rico) was a Puerto Rican politician and senator, pharmacist, and beauty queen. She won the Miss Mundo de Puerto Rico beauty pageant in 1972 and represented Puerto Rico in Miss World 1972 in London. Goyco then served as a member of the Senate of Puerto Rico from 1980 to 1992. Goyco died on February 8, 2019.

References

External links

Members of the Senate of Puerto Rico
Puerto Rican women in politics
2019 deaths
Popular Democratic Party (Puerto Rico) politicians
1972 in Puerto Rico
1950 births
Miss World 1972 delegates
Politicians from Ponce
Beauty queen-politicians